The U.S. Fleet Cyber Command is an operating force of the United States Navy responsible for the Navy's information network operations, offensive and defensive cyber operations, space operations and signals intelligence. It was created in January 2010 "to deter and defeat aggression and to ensure freedom of action to achieve military objectives in and through cyberspace". U.S. Tenth Fleet was simultaneously reactivated as its force provider. Since it was founded, the command has grown into an operational force composed of more than 16,000 active and reserve sailors and civilians organized into 27 active commands, 40 Cyber Mission Force units, and 27 reserve commands around the world.

Organization
U.S. Fleet Cyber Command serves as the Navy component command to U.S. Cyber Command, and the Navy's Service Cryptologic Component commander under the National Security Agency and Central Security Service. U.S. Fleet Cyber Command also reports directly to the Chief of Naval Operations as an Echelon II command and is responsible for Navy information network operations, offensive and defensive cyberspace operations, space operations and signals intelligence.

Headquartered at Fort George Meade, Maryland, U.S. Fleet Cyber Command exercises operational control of globally-deployed Cyber Mission Forces (CMF) through a task force structure aligned to the U.S. Tenth Fleet. U.S. Fleet Cyber Command is also designated as the Joint Force Headquarters-Cyber to U.S. Pacific Command and U.S. Southern Command for the development, oversight, planning and execution of full spectrum cyber operations aligned with other traditional warfighting lines of operation.

History 

U.S. Fleet Cyber Command's roots are in the namesake of its force provider, U.S. Tenth Fleet, which was organized in 1943 to coordinate the allied response to the German U-Boat threat and ensure access to the shipping lanes of the Atlantic.

Today, U.S. Fleet Cyber Command and the modern U.S. Tenth Fleet ensure the Navy and the Nation have access to systems in the cyber domain.

The creation of U.S. Cyber Command and U.S. Fleet Cyber Command 
Department of Defense cyber operations came together under a single organization on 1 October 2000, when U.S. Space Command (USSPACECOM) formally took control of the Department of Defense computer network attack activities from the Joint Staff.  USSPACECOM was eventually dissolved and some its functions merged into the reorganized U.S. Strategic Command (STRATCOM) 1 October 2002.

Navy Cyber operations were originally the responsibility of Naval Computer and Telecommunications Command, Naval Security Group and Naval Space Command, which were combined with 20 other commands into the Naval Network Warfare Command (NETWARCOM) in 2002 to unify network operations, offensive and defensive cyberspace operations, space operations and cryptologic/signals intelligences.

In 2005, with the alignment of Naval Security Group, NETWARCOM brought the former Naval Security Group Activities (NSGAs) under its umbrella and the mission of the command fundamentally changed, making it the Navy's lead command for information operations, networks and space.

After extensive study, Secretary of Defense Robert Gates directed the creation of a new sub-unified command, U.S. Cyber Command (USCYBERCOM) on 12 November 2008, to operate under the authority of USSTRATCOM.

U.S. Fleet Cyber Command was officially created as the Navy component to U.S. Cyber Command on 29 January 2010. Chief of Naval Operations Adm. Gary Roughead named Vice Adm. Bernard J. McCullough III as the commander of both U.S. Fleet Cyber Command and U.S. Tenth Fleet.  All subsequent commanders have led U.S. Fleet Cyber Command and U.S. Tenth Fleet simultaneously.

In August 2017, President Donald J. Trump announced the elevation of USCYBERCOM from a sub-unified command under USSTRATCOM to a Unified Combatant Command responsible for cyberspace operations. U.S. Fleet Cyber Command remains the Navy service component to USCYBERCOM.

List of Commanders

See also
 U.S. Cyber Command
 Navy Information Forces
 U.S. Navy Information Warfare Community

References

External links

U.S. Fleet Cyber Command
U.S. Fleet Cyber Command: Answering the Evolving Threat

United States Cyber Command
2010 establishments in Maryland